Tamarin is a Ndyuka Maroon village on the Cottica River in Suriname. Tamarin was the place of the Catholic mission on the Cottica River, which operated a church, a boarding school, a clinic, and a sawmill. The mission was deserted during the Surinamese Interior War. Only the school is still in operation today.

Since 2011, there has been a road connecting Tamarin to the East-West Link, via the laterite road that had already connected Wanhatti since 1972.

Notes

References
 

Ndyuka settlements
Populated places in Marowijne District